"Let Me Kiss You" is a song written by Morrissey and Alain Whyte. It was recorded (in two separate versions) by both Morrissey and by Nancy Sinatra, both of whom released their version as a single in the United Kingdom on 11 October 2004. Both versions entered the UK Singles Chart, Morrissey's peaking at number eight and Sinatra's at number 46. Morrissey's version also reached number 19 in Sweden and number 44 in Ireland.

Morrissey version
Morrissey's version of the song features on his album You Are the Quarry. It was also Morrissey's third top ten single of 2004.

The single also saw the release of the track "Don't Make Fun of Daddy's Voice", a song that had been in Morrissey's live set list since May and had opened his set at the Glastonbury Festival that year despite being unreleased.

Track listings
7" vinyl and CD 1
 "Let Me Kiss You"
 "Don't Make Fun of Daddy's Voice"

CD 2
 "Let Me Kiss You"
 "Friday Mourning"
 "I Am Two People"

Personnel
 Morrissey: vocals
 Alain Whyte: guitar
 Boz Boorer: guitar
 Gary Day: bass
 Deano Butterworth: drums
 Roger Manning: keyboard

Charts

Nancy Sinatra version
Nancy Sinatra's version was a minor UK hit and features Morrissey on backing vocals. It was released on Morrissey's vanity label, Attack Records.

Charts

References

Morrissey songs
Nancy Sinatra songs
2004 singles
Songs written by Morrissey
Songs written by Alain Whyte
Rock ballads
2004 songs
UK Independent Singles Chart number-one singles